Loretta Barrett Oden is an American chef, Native foods historian, food writer, and television show host. She is an enrolled member of the Potawatomi tribe. She wrote and hosted the PBS series Seasoned With Spirit: A Native Cook's Journey. Oden writes a column, Spirit of the Harvest, for Native Peoples Magazine.

Early life 
Oden was born in Shawnee, Oklahoma. She is a member of the Citizen Potawatomi Nation.

Career 
Oden spent three years traveling around the United States learning recipes from many different Native American tribes.

In the early 1990s when she was 50 years old, Oden opened a restaurant, Corn Dance Café in Santa Fe, New Mexico with her son Clayton. The dishes were inspired by the many tribal traditions she learned in her travels.

She returned to Oklahoma in 2003.

Oden is a native foods historian, food writer, and television show host. She is the chef consultant of the First Americans Museum in Oklahoma City, Oklahoma.  She is working with AARP on an elder meals program, Native Origins.

Oden wrote and hosted the PBS series Seasoned With Spirit: A Native Cook's Journey for which she won a New England Emmy.

She is a founding council member of the not-for-profit organization, Native American Food Sovereignty Alliance, for the food security of Native peoples; that they can continue to produce their own food in traditional ways.

Oden writes a column, Spirit of the Harvest, for Native Peoples Magazine.

Personal life
Oden was first married to Jerry Vandegrift, whose father started Van's Pig Stand, Oklahoma’s oldest single family owned barbecue restaurant. 

She has two sons and two stepdaughters from her second marriage.

References

External links
 
 The Movement to Define Native American Cuisine
 https://chefscollaborative.org/wp-content/uploads/2008/01/lorettaoden-isante.pdf
 https://archive.jsonline.com/features/food/native-american-chef-shares-indigenous-culinary-traditions-b99373455z1-281482041.html
 https://www.yahoo.com/lifestyle/restaurant-highlighting-diversity-history-native-223914430.html

Living people
Year of birth missing (living people)
People from Shawnee, Oklahoma
Citizen Potawatomi Nation people
Native American women writers
American women chefs
Native American chefs
Chefs from Oklahoma
American food writers
American women columnists
Women food writers
21st-century American women writers
Food historians
American women historians
21st-century American historians
Historians from Oklahoma
American television hosts
American television chefs
Historians of Native Americans
Journalists from Oklahoma
Native American journalists
21st-century Native American women
21st-century Native Americans
American women journalists